A total lunar eclipse took place on Sunday, April 2, 1950. This was the first total lunar eclipse of Saros cycle 131.

Visibility

It was visible from Africa, Europe, Asia, Madagascar, the Philippines, and totality occurred as the Moon set from the western side of Australia.

Related lunar eclipses

Lunar year series

Saros series

 
The next occurrence was on April 13, 1968. The previous occurrence was March 22, 1932.

See also
List of lunar eclipses
List of 20th-century lunar eclipses

Notes

External links

1950-04
1950 in science
April 1950 events